Al-Hamadiyya Mosque ( Masjid al-Hamadiyya) is the largest mosque in the Palestinian town of al-Khader, west of Bethlehem and serves the majority of the town's residents. The mosque was built in the early 15th century and was restored by the town's residents in the 1990s.

According to the International Middle East Media Center, in 2008, a group of Israeli settlers from Efrata and El'azar torched the mosque using stolen beehives as fuel. The mosque's imam and local Muslim leadership requested help from the Palestinian National Authority to help rebuild the mosque and to protect al-Khader from future attacks.

See also
 Mosque of Omar (Bethlehem)

References

15th-century mosques
Mamluk architecture in the State of Palestine
Mosques in the West Bank
Al-Khader